The common green tree skink (Papuascincus flavipes) is a species of skink. It is found in Papua New Guinea.

Names
It is known as mañmol in the Kalam language of Papua New Guinea.

Habitat
Papuascincus flavipes is an arboreal species.

References

Prasinohaema
Skinks of New Guinea
Reptiles described in 1936
Taxa named by Hampton Wildman Parker